The New Jersey Department of the Public Advocate was a department within the Executive branch of the government of New Jersey that acted as a voice on behalf of the people of the state. It was responsible to make government "more accountable and responsive to the needs of New Jersey residents" through legal advocacy, policy research and reform and community and legislative outreach.

The department was originally created in 1974 by Governor Brendan Byrne, The first Public Advocate was Stanley Van Ness.

The agency was dissolved in 1994. The New Jersey Legislature passed the Public Advocate Restoration Act in 2005, which was signed into law on July 12, 2005, by Governor Richard Codey.

In 2006, Governor Jon Corzine appointed Ronald Chen to serve as the first Public Advocate since the position had been abolished in 1994.

The previous Public Advocate was Zulima Farber, who served as state Public Advocate from 1992 to 1994 in the Cabinet of former Governor James Florio.

Wilfredo Caraballo served as Public Advocate from 1990 to 1992, resigning in protest of Republican Party efforts in the legislature to reduce his powers.

Upon entering office as governor in early 2010, Republican Chris Christie began plotting the elimination of this department.  On June 29, 2010, Governor Christie abolished the Department of the Public Advocate, transferring some offices and divisions to other departments, and abolishing others.

References

State agencies of New Jersey
Government agencies established in 1974
Government agencies disestablished in 1994
Government agencies established in 2005
Government agencies disestablished in 2010
1974 establishments in New Jersey